Sarah Jane Smith: The TAO Connection is a Big Finish Productions audio drama based on the long-running British science fiction television series Doctor Who. It stars Elisabeth Sladen reprising her role as Sarah Jane Smith.

Plot 
After the body of one of Josh's friends is found floating in the Thames, Sarah Jane heads towards West Yorkshire to investigate the Huang Ti Clinic.

Cast
Sarah Jane Smith – Elisabeth Sladen
DC Johnson – Alistair Lock
DI Morrison – Mark Donovan
Josh Townsend – Jeremy James
Ellie Martin – Juliet Warner
Natalie Redfern – Sadie Miller
Claudia Coster – Caroline Burns-Cook
Will Butley – Moray Treadwell
Nurse Jephson – Jane McFarlane
Mr Sharpe – Steven Wickham
Read – Robert Curbishley
Wong Chu – Toby Longworth
Mrs Lythe – Maggie Stables
Meg Hawkins – Wendy Albiston

Notes
Maggie Stables also plays Evelyn Smythe, a companion of the Sixth Doctor, in many audio dramas in Big Finish Production's main Doctor Who range.

External links
Big Finish Productions – ''Sarah Jane Smith: The TAO Connection

TAO Connection
2002 audio plays